V75 may refer to:
 Vitronectin, a human gene
 Special screening examination for other infectious diseases, in the Icd9 v codes detail

V.75 may refer to:
 V.75, an ITU-T modem standard